Gao Shuying (born October 28, 1979 in Qingdao, Shandong) is a Chinese pole vaulter.

At the 2004 Summer Olympics she was eliminated in the first round of the pole vault competition.

Her personal best is 4.64 metres, achieved in 2007 in New York City.

Achievements

External links

1979 births
Living people
Athletes (track and field) at the 2000 Summer Olympics
Athletes (track and field) at the 2004 Summer Olympics
Athletes (track and field) at the 2008 Summer Olympics
Chinese female pole vaulters
Olympic athletes of China
Asian Games medalists in athletics (track and field)
Athletes from Qingdao
Athletes (track and field) at the 2002 Asian Games
Athletes (track and field) at the 2006 Asian Games
Universiade medalists in athletics (track and field)
Asian Games gold medalists for China
Medalists at the 2002 Asian Games
Medalists at the 2006 Asian Games
Universiade gold medalists for China
Medalists at the 2001 Summer Universiade